Judo at the 1992 Summer Paralympics consisted of seven events for men.

Medal summary

Medal table

Notes

References 

 

1992 Summer Paralympics events
1992
Paralympics
Judo competitions in Spain